Raymond Thomas Bailey (May 6, 1904 – April 15, 1980) was an American actor, and comedian on the Broadway stage, films, and television. He is best known for his role as greedy banker Milburn Drysdale in the television series The Beverly Hillbillies.

Early life and attempts at acting
Bailey was born in San Francisco, California, the son of William and Alice (née O'Brien) Bailey. When he was a teenager he went to Hollywood to become a movie star. He found it was harder than he had thought, however, and took a variety of short-term jobs. He worked for a time as a day laborer at a movie studio in the days of silent pictures, but was fired for sneaking into a mob scene while it was being filmed. He also worked for a while as a stockbroker and a banker.

Having no success receiving movie roles of any kind, Bailey then went to New York City where he had no better success obtaining roles in theatre. Eventually he began working as a merchant seaman and sailed to various parts of the world, including China, Japan, the Philippines and the Mediterranean. While docked in Hawaii, he worked on a pineapple plantation, acted at the community theatre and sang on a local radio program.

Success on the second try at acting
In 1938, he decided to try Hollywood again. His luck changed for the better when he actually began getting some bit parts in movies.  He appeared as the character of Mr. West in the action adventure serial The Green Hornet (1940). After the United States entered World War II he again served in the United States Merchant Marine. When the war was over he returned to Hollywood and eventually began getting bigger character roles.

Early roles in television, Broadway and film

Television
In the early 1950s, Bailey was cast in many character roles in television series, such as Alfred Hitchcock Presents, Tales of Tomorrow (episode "Ice from Space"), Frontier, Crusader, My Friend Flicka (episode "When Bugles Blow"), Gunsmoke (episodes "General Parsley Smith" and "The Big Con"), Tightrope, State Trooper, Coronado 9, and Johnny Ringo.

Other appearances were on The George Burns and Gracie Allen Show, Private Secretary, Playhouse 90, The Rifleman, Laramie, Bat Masterson, The Jack Benny Program, Yancy Derringer, Riverboat, Bourbon Street Beat, 77 Sunset Strip, Hennesey, The Twilight Zone, three times on Bonanza, One Step Beyond, The Untouchables, Have Gun-Will Travel, The Tab Hunter Show, Pete and Gladys, The Donna Reed Show, Bachelor Father, Going My Way, The Tom Ewell Show, The Investigators,  Science Fiction Theatre (episode "The Long Day"), Whirlybirds, twice on Mister Ed, and twice on Wagon Train.

Bailey made two guest appearances on Perry Mason, playing banker Mr. Hilliard in "The Case of the Caretaker's Cat," and Dr. Bell in "The Case of the Injured Innocent." During its 1960–1961 season, he had a regular role on My Sister Eileen and guest-starred on Pat O'Brien's ABC sitcom Harrigan and Son. He appeared in the 1962–1963 season as Dean McGruder on CBS's The Many Loves Of Dobie Gillis.

Broadway plays
Bailey appeared in four Broadway plays, as Howard Haines in Last Stop (1944), playing an unknown man in The Bat (1953), A. J. Alexander in Sing Till Tomorrow (1953), and Captain Randolph Southard in The Caine Mutiny Court-Martial (1954–1955), which starred Henry Fonda.

Film roles
Bailey's film roles include playing a member of the board in the comedy/romance Sabrina (1954) starring Humphrey Bogart, Audrey Hepburn and William Holden; Mr. Benson in the drama Picnic (1955) starring William Holden and Kim Novak; a doctor in Hitchcock's drama/thriller Vertigo (1958) starring James Stewart and Novak; a Colonel in the comedy No Time for Sergeants (1958) starring Andy Griffith; the warden of San Quentin in the crime/dramas I Want to Live! starring Susan Hayward and as Philip Dressler in The Lineup (1958); lawyer Brancato in the crime drama Al Capone (1959) starring Rod Steiger; and Major General Alexander "Archie" Vandegrift in the World War II drama The Gallant Hours (1960). He also played a plantation owner in Band of Angels (1957) starring Clark Gable, Sidney Poitier and Yvonne De Carlo. He also played in the low-budget horror classic, Tarantula! (1955), and had a small role in Irwin Allen's Five Weeks in a Balloon (1962).

Mr. Drysdale on The Beverly Hillbillies
In The Beverly Hillbillies, Nancy Kulp portrayed Bailey's ever loyal and by-the-book secretary, Miss Jane Hathaway. Banker Drysdale managed the millions of dollars in oil money royalties in the bank account of country gentleman Jed Clampett (portrayed by Buddy Ebsen). He was so keen on keeping an eye on the Clampetts that he convinced them to buy the mansion right next door to his own, in ritzy Beverly Hills. Often, Mr. Drysdale would be required to talk with Clampett about how strange "city life" and "city folk" are (when compared to Mr. Clampett's view of "normal" country folk). On occasions when Mr. Clampett was considering withdrawing all his funds and returning to the country (his home near Bug Tussle), the miserly Mr. Drysdale would often panic and desperately work to try keep the family (and their fortune) in Beverly Hills.

Bailey began feeling the symptoms of Alzheimer's disease around the time of the final episodes of The Beverly Hillbillies. He made only two film appearances after the show's 1971 cancellation — the Disney features Herbie Rides Again (1974) and The Strongest Man in the World (1975) — before retiring in 1975 due to the effects of the disease.

In his final years, Bailey divided his time between a condominium and a houseboat in Laguna Niguel, California. He kept in touch with former co-star Nancy Kulp (whom he nicknamed "Slim") but was primarily a recluse.

Death
Raymond Bailey died of a heart attack on April 15, 1980, aged 75, in Irvine, California. His body was cremated and his ashes were scattered at sea.  He was survived by his wife, Gaby Aida George, and was an uncle of actor William Sylvester.

Selected filmography

Blackwell's Island (1939) as Cash Sutton, a Henchman (uncredited)
Made for Each Other (1939) as Salt Lake City Hospital Chemist (uncredited)
Secret Service of the Air (1939) as Klune – Henchman Starting Fight (uncredited)
The Adventures of Jane Arden (1939) as Vanders' Henchman Driving Car (uncredited)
S.O.S. Tidal Wave (1939) as Roy Nixon
Daredevils of the Red Circle (1939, Serial) as Stanley, Secretary [Chs. 1–3, 11]
Hell's Kitchen (1939) as Whitey
They All Come Out (1939) as Hughie (uncredited)
Each Dawn I Die (1939) as Convict (uncredited)
I Stole a Million (1939) as Cabby (uncredited)
Coast Guard (1939) as First Officer (uncredited)
Flight at Midnight (1939) as Bill Hawks
Sabotage (1939) (uncredited)
The Roaring Twenties (1939) as 2nd Ex-Con (uncredited)
Invisible Stripes (1939) as Bookie (uncredited)
The Green Hornet (1940) as Mr. West [Ch. 6] (uncredited)
Black Friday (1940) as Louis Devore (uncredited)
Forgotten Girls (1940) as Reporter (uncredited)
Island of Doomed Men (1940) as Mystery Killer (uncredited)
Florian (1940) as White-haired Soldier (uncredited)
I Love You Again (1940) as First Man Greeting Wilson in Pottery Office (uncredited)
The Secret Seven (1940) as Racketeer (uncredited)
A Man Betrayed (1941) as Amato Henchman (uncredited)
The People vs. Dr. Kildare (1941) as Father (uncredited)
The Male Animal (1942) as Reporter on Porch (uncredited)
The Mystery of Marie Roget (1942) as Gendarme (uncredited)
Embraceable You (1948) as Truck Driver (uncredited)
The Girl from Jones Beach (1949) as Party Guest (uncredited)
The Kangaroo Kid (1950) as Quinn
Sabrina (1954) as Member of the Board (uncredited)
Tarantula! (1955) as Townsend
The Girl in the Red Velvet Swing (1955) as Judge Fitzgerald (uncredited)
The Return of Jack Slade (1955) as Professor
Picnic (1955) as Mr. Benson
Time Table (1956) as Sam Hendricks (uncredited)
Outside the Law (1956) as Philip Bormann
Congo Crossing (1956) as Peter Mannering
I've Lived Before (1956) as Joseph Hackett, Federal Airways
Away All Boats (1956) as RAdm. Stacy Bender (uncredited)
The Girl He Left Behind (1956) as General
The Great American Pastime (1956) as George Carruthers
The Incredible Shrinking Man (1957) as Doctor Thomas Silver
Band of Angels (1957) as Mr. Stuart
Darby's Rangers (1958) as Brig. Gen. W.A. Wise
Underwater Warrior (1958) as Adm. Ashton
Lafayette Escadrille (1958) as Amos J. Walker
The Lineup (1958) as Philip Dressler
Vertigo (1958) as Scottie's Doctor
No Time for Sergeants (1958) as Base Colonel
The Space Children (1958) as Dr. Wahrman
King Creole (1958) as Mr. Evans – School Principal
I Want to Live! (1958) as San Quentin Warden
Al Capone (1959) as Lawyer Brancato
Wake Me When It's Over (1960) as Gen. Weigang
The Gallant Hours (1960) as Maj. Gen. Archie Vandergrift
From the Terrace (1960) as Mr. Eugene St.John
The Absent Minded Professor (1961) as Admiral Olmstead
The Beverly Hillbillies (1962–1971, TV Series) as Milburn Drysdale
Five Weeks in a Balloon (1962) as Randolph
Herbie Rides Again (1974) as Lawyer
The Strongest Man in the World (1975) as Regent Burns (final film role)

See also

References

External links

1904 births
1980 deaths
American male stage actors
American male film actors
American male television actors
American male radio actors
American sailors
Male actors from San Francisco
American bankers
United States Merchant Mariners of World War II
20th-century American male actors
20th-century American businesspeople
People from Laguna Niguel, California